Ronan van Zandbeek (born 27 September 1988) is a Dutch cyclist, who most recently rode for Dutch amateur team Invicta.

Born in 's-Hertogenbosch, van Zandbeek competed as a professional between 2011 and 2015, joining the  team full-time after a stagiaire contract with the team in the second half of 2010. Having previously won the Tour de Normandie as an amateur in 2010, van Zandbeek won his first professional race in September 2012 as he won the Kampioenschap van Vlaanderen event. Van Zandbeek had accelerated away from five other riders in the closing stages of the race.

Major results

2006
 1st Stage 5 Tour de Lorraine
 3rd  Road race, UEC European Junior Road Championships
 3rd Time trial, National Junior Road Championships
 3rd Overall Driedaagse van Axel
1st Stage 2 (ITT)
2007
 3rd Time trial, National Under-23 Road Championships
 3rd Dorpenomloop door Drenthe
2008
 1st  Road race, National Under-23 Road Championships
 2nd Beek Ubbergen
 5th Overall Tour du Haut-Anjou
2009
 1st Ronde van Haarlemmerliede en Spaarnwoude
 2nd Ronde van Zuid-Holland
 5th Duo Normand
 8th Overall Tour du Haut-Anjou
 9th Ronde van Vlaanderen U23
 9th Paris–Roubaix Espoirs
2010
 1st  Overall Tour de Normandie
 4th Paris–Roubaix Espoirs
 10th Profronde van Fryslan
2011
 4th Overall Tour de Wallonie-Picarde
2012
 1st Kampioenschap van Vlaanderen
2013
 1st Prologue (TTT) Volta a Portugal
 7th Arno Wallaard Memorial
 7th Memorial Van Coningsloo
2014
 8th Arno Wallaard Memorial
 10th Overall Flèche du Sud
1st  Mountains classification
2015
 4th Overall Olympia's Tour
 6th Ster van Zwolle

References

External links

Argos-Shimano profile

Cycling Quotient profile

Dutch male cyclists
1988 births
Living people
Sportspeople from 's-Hertogenbosch
Cyclists from North Brabant